The year 1631 in music involved some significant events.

Events 
January 9 – The masque Love's Triumph Through Callipolis, written by Ben Jonson and designed by Inigo Jones, is performed at Whitehall Palace; the work features music by Nicholas Lanier.
 In Venice, the plague outbreak of 1629–1631, after reducing the population by one third, comes to an end.  Claudio Monteverdi writes a mass for a service of thanksgiving, held at St Mark's Basilica.
Marco Marazzoli is one of several musicians who accompany Cardinal Antonio Barberini on a visit to Urbino.
Earliest known bentside spinet, made by Hieronymus de Zentis.

Publications 
Christoph Demantius –  for six voices (Freiberg: Georg Hoffmann)
Melchior Franck
 for two, three, four, five, six, seven, and eight voices with basso continuo (Nuremberg: Wolfgang Endter), a collection of sacred songs
 for four and five voices (Nuremberg: Wolfgang Endter), a collection of motets
 for four voices (Coburg: Kaspar Bertsch), a motet of national consolation, setting Psalm 122
Giovanni Girolamo Kapsberger
, vol. 1 (Rome: Paolo Masotti) 
, vol. 1 (Rome: Paolo Masotti)
Filipe de Magalhães – Book of Masses  (Lisbon: Lourenço Craesbeeck)
Thomas Morley – an edition of his canzonets.
Cornelis Padbrué –  (collection of madrigals)
Giovanni Palazzotto e Tagliavia — , book three (Messina: Pietro Brea)

Classical music 
Claudio Monteverdi – Mass of Thanksgiving

Opera 
Stefano Landi – Il Sant'Alessio (with libretto by Giulio Rospigliosi): Palazzo Barberini alle Quattro Fontane, 18 February 1632.

Births 
October – Pierre Beauchamp, choreographer, dancer and composer (died 1705)
October 3 – Sebastian Anton Scherer, composer (died 1712)

Deaths 
January 3 – Michelagnolo Galilei, lutenist and composer (born 1575)
March 24 – Philipp Dulichius, composer (born 1562)
August 6 – Juan Blas de Castro, singer and composer (born 1561)
date unknown – Christoph Straus, German choral composer (born 1575)

References

 
Music
17th century in music
Music by year